Nethra Kumanan (born 21 August 1997) is an Olympian in the Sport of ILCA6 Women (popularly known as Laser Radial Sailing) from India. She is the first Indian Woman to qualify for Olympics in Sailing directly and by being the first Asian at the Olympic qualifier event for the 2020 Tokyo Olympics. At her maiden Olympics she finished 35th out 44 participants.

Earlier in January, 2020, Nethra Kumanan had become the first Indian woman to win a bronze medal at the Hempel Sailing World Cup Series, in Miami, U.S.A. She has also won over 20 medals at national and international sailing championships including National Sailing Championship events in India, Israel, Hungary and Spain.

Nethra has represented India at the Asian Games in 2014 in S. Korea and in 2018 in Jakarta where she finished seventh & fifth respectively. At the Tokyo Olympics in 2020 she finished 35th overall with a best finish of 15th in the third race of the Laser Radial category for women out of 44 participants. She intends to qualify and do better at the next Olympics in Paris in 2024.

She is studying B.Tech- Mechanical Engineering (final year) in SRM University, Vadapalani campus.

Early life and education 
Nethra Kumanan was born in Chennai, Tamil Nadu, India. Her parents are V C Kumanan, an entrepreneur running an IT company after 3 decades of working in the BFSI sector as IT Head / CISO for many years and mother is Sreeja Kumanan who is a HR Professional. She has a brother Naveen Kumanan aged 21 years studying B Tech (IS) at Michigan State University, USA who was also in the Indian National Sailing Squad for many years before he decided to focus on studies.

Nethra did her schooling from Patasala Montessori School upto 6th standard and thereafter studied at The School, KFI(Krishnamurti Foundation of India) till the 10th standard. Thereafter she took to National Institute of Schooling (NIOS) and finished her 12th and this also helped her to stay focussed on her sailing training. During these formative years she has also learnt a long list of arts and sports and has also won many trophies. These include Bharatanatyam which she learnt for about 6 years under her Guru Mrs Alarmel Valli, a leading Indian Classical dancer & choreographer, a Padma Shri & Padma Bhushan awardee. She was an avid Arts person and has won trophies at Global Art International Competitions held in Singapore, Vietnam, Indonesia in various years. Apart from being active in these, she has also learnt Kalari Payuttu, Mountain biking, tennis, skating, basketball, swimming and not surprisingly she was also good in her academics.

After her schooling she joined Anna University in the Mechanical Engineering Dept under the sports quota in 2017 but had to drop out after a year to prepare for the upcoming Asian Games. 

Thereafter she joined SRM Institute of Science and Technology of SRM University in Chennai. This institute has been very supportive of sportspersons and helping them manage their studies in parallel.

References

External links
 
 
 

1997 births
Living people
Indian female sailors (sport)
Olympic sailors of India
Sailors at the 2020 Summer Olympics – Laser Radial
Sailors at the 2014 Asian Games
Sailors at the 2018 Asian Games